Scopula magnidiscata is a moth of the family Geometridae. It was described by Warren in 1904. It is endemic to Angola.

References

Moths described in 1904
magnidiscata
Insects of Angola
Moths of Africa
Endemic fauna of Angola